John Duncan Vaughan Campbell, 5th Earl Cawdor, TD (17 May 1900 – 1970), styled Viscount Emlyn between 1911 and 1914, was a Scots-Welsh nobleman.

Campbell was the son of Hugh Campbell, 4th Earl Cawdor and Joan Emily Mary Thynne. He fought in the First World War, with the Royal Navy and was awarded the Territorial Decoration. He fought in the Second World War as a Lieutenant-Colonel and was mentioned in despatches. He was invested as a Fellow, Royal Geographical Society, the Society of Antiquaries of Scotland and the Society of Antiquaries.

Lord Cawdor married, firstly, Wilma Mairi Vickers (1906–1982), daughter of Vincent Cartwright Vickers, on 15 May 1929. They had three children:

 Lady Caroline Mairi Campbell (1930–1977), had issue. 
 Hugh John Vaughan Campbell, 6th Earl Cawdor (1932–1993), had issue. 
 Hon. James Alexander Campbell (1942–2019), had issue, four daughters.

They were divorced in 1961. He married, secondly, Elizabeth Topham Richardson, daughter of John Topham Richardson, on 29 June 1961.

References

External links

1900 births
1970 deaths
Earls in the Peerage of the United Kingdom
Royal Navy officers of World War I
Fellows of the Royal Geographical Society
Fellows of the Society of Antiquaries of London
Deputy Lieutenants of Caernarvonshire
5